The Kregel Wind Mill Company produced water pumping windmills in Nebraska City, Nebraska starting in 1879.  It is now the Kregel Windmill Factory Museum.

History
The brand of windmills that the Kregel Windmill Company produced was called "ELI" — as an homage to one of George Kregel's friends, a deceased preacher named Eli Huber. Kregel windmills were used to pump water from wells at farms and homes in the region of southeastern Nebraska surrounding Nebraska City. Managed by George F. Kregel, the company moved to the current Central Avenue building in 1903, continuing to operate there for 88 years.

The Central Avenue factory has been preserved with all of its manufacturing equipment. The machinery in the factory is powered by a central transverse line shaft and leather belts coming down to pulleys on each machine. The line shaft itself was originally powered by a single cylinder engine, but was converted to electricity in the 1920s. After manufacturing more than 2000 windmills, the company stopped production in the 1940s, and the Kregels worked instead in pump repair and well maintenance until 1991 in the same location.

The factory is a one-story wood-frame building. The flat-roofed building has two small roof monitors for light and ventilation. The front facade is clad with pressed sheet metal in a brick pattern, with four bays. The interior is a large open space with two structural bays, and a small office space. All of the company's tools (including "ledger books on shelves, telephone, pencils and pens on the desk, even an overcoat on a hook") and records have been preserved.

Since September 2019, the executive director has been Isaiah Yott.

Machinery
Featured machinery in the factory includes:

 Turret Lathe, 1920
 Power shear, punch and riveting machine, 1875
 Metal-turning lathe, 1865
 Drill presses, 1900
 Broaching machine, 1910
 Four-spindle production drill press, 1900
 Pedestal grinder, 1910
 Internal grinder, 1910
 Drop hammer, 1900
 Snag grinder, 1900
 Cross-cutoff circular saw, 1900
 Table saw, 1900
 Thickness planer, 1900
 Joiner, 1900
 Sheet metal bench with tools, 1910
 Sheet metal rolls, 1900
 Beading machine, 1900
 Sheet metal brake, 1900
 Sheet metal shear, 1900
 Power transmission system, 1900
 Power hacksaw, 1900

See also

List of museums in Nebraska
National Register of Historic Places listings in Otoe County, Nebraska

References

External links
Kregel Windmill Factory Museum

History museums in Nebraska
Museums in Otoe County, Nebraska
Buildings and structures in Nebraska City, Nebraska
Agriculture museums in the United States
Industry museums in the United States
Technology museums in the United States
1879 establishments in Nebraska
Industrial buildings and structures on the National Register of Historic Places in Nebraska
Agriculture in Nebraska
Historic American Engineering Record in Nebraska
Tourist attractions in Nebraska City, Nebraska
Romanesque Revival architecture in Nebraska
National Register of Historic Places in Otoe County, Nebraska
Windmills in the United States